The Special Transcaucasian Committee (Russian: Особый Закавказский Комитет Osobyi Zakavkazskii Komitet (OZaKom, Ozakom or OZAKOM)) was established on March 9, 1917, with Member of the State Duma V. A. Kharlamov as Chairman, to replace the Imperial Viceroy Grand Duke Nikolai Nikolaevich and with special instruction to establish civil administrations in areas occupied in the course of the war on the Caucasian front by the Russian Provisional Government in the Transcaucasus as the highest organ of the civil administrative body. Commissars were appointed for the Terek Oblast and the Kuban Oblast, and these as well as the Committee were to carry on relations with central government institutions through a Commissar for Caucasian Affairs in Petrograd attached to the Provisional Government.

Soviets also sprang up throughout the area and, in time, organized an influential Regional Center at Tiflis, using the loyalty of the Russian Armenians. Hakob Zavriev was instrumental in having Ozakom issue a decree about the administration of the occupied territories. This region was officially identified as "the land of Turkish Armenia" and transferred to a civilian rule under Zavriev, who oversaw districts Trebizon, Erzurum, Bitlis, and Van. Each of the districts under Administration for Western Armenia had their own Armenian governor, with Armenian civil officials.

In November 1917, the first government of the independent Transcaucasia was created in Tbilisi as the "Transcaucasian Commissariat (Sejm)" replaced "Transcaucasian Committee" following the Bolshevik seizure of power in Saint Petersburg. It was headed by a Georgian Menshevik Nikolay Chkheidze. On December 5, 1917, this new "Transcaucasian Committee" given the endorsement to Armistice of Erzincan that was signed with the Ottoman command of the Third Army. This was followed with what is known as Trabzon peace negotiations. On February 10, 1918, the Sejm gathered and made the decision to establish independence. On February 24, 1918, Sejm proclaimed Transcaucasia independent under Transcaucasian Democratic Federative Republic. Headed by the Georgian Social Democrat Evgeni Gegechkori, Transcaucasian Commissariat was anti-Bolshevik in its political goals and sought the separation of Transcaucasia from Bolshevik Russia.

The committee ignored the Social Democratic hegemony in the region and provoked the Soviets to demand its abolition.

Members 

The Ozakom was composed of five members:
 Vasily Kharlamov, Chairman, Russian;
 Kita Abashidze, Social-Federalist, Georgian, subsequently replaced by Akaki Chkhenkeli (also Georgian);
 Mammad Yusif Jafarov, Azerbaijani.
 Michael Papadjanian, Armenian.

References

See also 
 Transcaucasian Democratic Federative Republic
 Administration for Western Armenia

Russian Provisional Government
History of Transcaucasia
Modern history of Armenia
Modern history of Azerbaijan
Modern history of Georgia (country)
1910s in Georgia (country)
1910s in Armenia
1910s in Azerbaijan
1917 establishments in Russia
1917 disestablishments in Russia
1917 establishments in Georgia (country)
1917 disestablishments in Georgia (country)
Caucasus Viceroyalty (1801–1917)
Provisional governments
Russian Revolution
Post–Russian Empire states